Events from the year 1566 in Sweden

Incumbents
 Monarch – Eric XIV

Events

 26 March - 250 Swedes die in an attempt to capture Bohus Fortress.
 June - Nils Svantesson Sture falls from favor with the monarch and are exposed to public humiliation. 
 
 
 13 July – The Danes burn Bogesund.
 15 July  – The Danes burn Falköping.
 23 July  – The Danes burn Skara domkyrka.
 26 July - Action of 26 July 1566
 - Ivan the Terrible ask to have the King's sister-in-law Catherine Jagiellon delivered as a hostage to use against Poland. 
 - The Danes under Daniel Rantzau pillage Västergötland, while the Swedes pillage Skåne.

Births

 20 June - Sigismund III Vasa, monarch   (died 1632)
 15 October - Sigrid of Sweden (1566–1633), princess   (died 1633)

Deaths

 September 9 - Klas Horn, naval admiral   (born 1517)

References

 
Years of the 16th century in Sweden
Sweden